Mir of Hunza was the title of rulers in the Hunza Valley in the Northern Areas, Pakistan.

Etymology 
The Mir used to have the Burushaski title of Thum (also Tham or Thom), later changed to Mir, a Persian form of the Arabic title Emir.

Timeline 
 Mir Salim Khan I
 Mir Shah Sultan Khan
 Mir Shahbaz Khan (1710 - Unknown)
 Mir Shahbeg Khan
 Mir Shah Khisrow Khan (1750 - 1790)
 Mir Mirza Khan (1790)
 Mir Salim Khan II (1790 - 1825)
 Mir Ghazanfar Ali Khan I (1825 - 1864)
 Mir Muhammad Ghazan Khan I (1864 - 1886)
 Mir Safdar Ali Khan (1886 - 1891)
 Mir Safdar fled to China after conquest of Hunza and Nagar States by British Forces in December 1891.Prince Muhammad Nafis Khan was the main contender of Mir-ship of Hunza on the grounds that he was the elder son of Mir Muhammad Ghazan Khan-I and has the legitimate right to be appointed as Mir of Hunza but His younger brother Nazim Khan was placed in his position by British Raj in September 1892.
 Mir Muhammad Nazim Khan (1892 - 1938)
 Mir Muhammad Ghazan Khan II (1938 - 1945)
 Mir Muhammad Jamal Khan (1945 - 1976)
 Jamal Khan was last ruling Mir of Hunza. His powers were abolished in the dissolution of Hunza state by Z.A. Bhutto on 25 September 1974.
 Mir Ghazanfar Ali Khan II (title in pretense, 1976 – present)

Abolishment 
In 1974 the state became a part of Gilgit-Baltistan, Pakistan under the Pakistani Federal Government. The last Mir of Hunza was Mir Muhammad Jamal Khan.

Current Situation 
In the years to follow, the title of Mir was used as symbol of respect for the former Mirs of Hunza. Consequently, Mir Mohammad Jamal Khan's eldest son, Mir Ghazanfar Ali Khan (born 31 December 1945), uses the title of Mir on his official documents. Amongst other benefits to the former rulers, the federal Government also pays a privy purse or a monthly stipend to the current Mir Ghazanfar Ali Khan. The family is also allowed to retain the former vehicle number plates bearing 'Hunza'.

After the abolition of Hunza State, the Northern Areas, now known as Gilgit-Baltistan region, fell under the jurisdiction of the federal government. Mir Ghazanfar Ali Khan contested the elections several times from his hometown of Karimabad and served as a member of the Gilgit-Baltistan Assembly. His last position of prominence was as Leader of the House and the first Chief Minister of Gilgit-Baltistan under the rule of President Musharraf.

In the general election of 2009, Mir Ghazanfar's son Prince Shehryar Khan (born 5 June 1977) contested the election in place of his father but did not succeed in securing the majority votes from the region; however, he won by a majority in his hometown of Karimabad.

See also 
Hunza (princely state)

References

External links
The Changing Northern Areas
Pakistan's Northern Areas dilemma 
Northern Areas Development Gateway
Pakistan's Northern Areas
Northern Pakistan's Karakoram & Hindukush Mountains
The Mountain Areas Conservancy Project
Not ‘Mir of Hunza’ An anti-Mir letter to the editor: one man's opinion, and of undetermined significance.
Welcome To Hunza Valley Heaven On The Earth In Northern Areas Of Pakistan. Enjoy Burushaski Music Songs, Shinaki Music Songs online with The http://www.hunza.20m.com

Hunza
Muslim princely states of India